Girish Sharma  (born 27 August 1985) is an Indian television presenter, event host, comedian and entertainer. Girish Sharma also known for his anchor training videos on YouTube. Girish Sharma has Hosted Amitabh Bachchan Jaya Bachchan Anniversary Function. His Performance was Praised By Many at Sonam Kapoor And Anand Ahuja Pre-Wedding Night. Girish Sharma Won Best Anchor  in India Gold Award at WeddingSutra Influencer Awards 2021.

Personal life
Girish Sharma was born in Yamunanagar, Haryana. His family hails from Biron Dewal Uttrakhand.His father passed away when he was in 10th class. He did schooling from B D Senior Secondary School Ambala Cantt.

Career
Girish Sharma worked with zoOm TV as a Producer where he also appeared as zoom ki Guthhi in promotional video of Comedy nights with Kapil for zoOm TV. He started his YouTube channel of Anchoring Training Video.

Characters By Girish Sharma

References

External links
 Girish Sharma on Facebook

1985 births
Living people
21st-century Indian male actors
Indian male film actors
Indian stand-up comedians